Hamnet Shakespeare (baptised 2 February 1585 – buried 11 August 1596) was the only son of William Shakespeare and Anne Hathaway, and the fraternal twin of Judith Shakespeare. He died at the age of 11. Some Shakespearean scholars speculate on the relationship between Hamnet and his father's later play Hamlet, as well as on possible connections between Hamnet's death and the writing of King John, Romeo and Juliet, Julius Caesar, and Twelfth Night.

Life
Little is known about Hamnet. Hamnet and his twin sister Judith were born in Stratford-upon-Avon and baptised on 2 February 1585 in Holy Trinity Church by Richard Barton of Coventry. The twins were probably named after Hamnet Sadler, a baker, who witnessed Shakespeare's will, and his wife, Judith; Hamnet was not an uncommon personal name in medieval and early modern England. According to the record of his baptism in the Register of Solihull, he was christened "Hamlette Sadler". (See "Connection to Hamlet and other plays" below for a discussion about Hamnet's potential relationship to his father's tragedy, Hamlet.)

Hamnet Shakespeare was probably raised principally by his mother Anne in the Henley Street house belonging to his grandfather.

By the time Hamnet was four, his father was already a London playwright and, as his popularity grew, he was probably not regularly at home in Stratford with his family. Honan believes that Hamnet may have completed Lower School, which would have been normal, before his death at the age of eleven. He was buried in Stratford on 11 August 1596. At that time in England about a third of all children died before age 10.

Connection to Hamlet and other plays

Scholars have long speculated about the influence – if any – of Hamnet's death upon William Shakespeare's writing. Unlike his contemporary Ben Jonson, who wrote a lengthy piece on the death of his own son, Shakespeare, if he wrote anything in response, did so more subtly. At the time his son died, Shakespeare was writing primarily comedies, and that writing continued until a few years after Hamnet's death when his major tragedies were written. It is possible that his tragedies gained depth from his experience.

Biographical readings, in which critics would try to connect passages in the plays and sonnets to specific events in Shakespeare's life, are at least as old as the Romantic period. Many famous writers, scholars, and critics from the 18th to the early 20th century pondered the connection between Hamnet's death and Shakespeare's plays. These scholars and critics included Samuel Taylor Coleridge, Edward Dowden, and J. Dover Wilson, among others. In 1931, C. J. Sisson stated that such interpretations had "gone too far". In 1934, Shakespeare scholar R. W. Chambers agreed, saying that Shakespeare's most cheerful work was written after his son's death, making a connection doubtful. In the mid-to-late 20th century, it became increasingly unpopular for critics to connect events in authors' lives with their work, not just for Shakespeare, but for all writing. More recently, however, as the ideas of the New Criticism have lost prominence, biographical interpretations of Hamnet's relationship to his father's work have begun to re-emerge.

Some theories about Hamnet's influence on his father's plays are centred on the tragedy Hamlet, composed between 1599 and 1601. The traditional view, that grief over his only son's death may have spurred Shakespeare to write the play, is in all likelihood incorrect. Although the names Hamlet and Hamnet were considered virtually interchangeable, and Shakespeare's own will spelled Hamnet Sadler's first name as "Hamlett", critics often assume that the name of the character in the play has an entirely different derivation, and so do not comment on the similarity.

John Dover Wilson, one of the few editors of Hamlet to comment directly, remarks, “It is perhaps an accident that the name [Hamlet] was current in Warwickshire and that Shakespeare’s own son Hamnet (born 1585) was christened Hamnet, a variant of it.” However Eric Sams points out that it seems to be the author of the Ur-Hamlet who first put an “H” in front of the character’s name, and argues that this might be significant: “It was no mere Englishing; he could readily have been called Amleth here too. He had been deliberately rebaptised by his new creator." Sams describes the Christian name Hamlet as “otherwise unrecorded in any archive ever researched” outside Tudor Stratford, and argues that this name-change was probably Shakespeare’s work, because “Only Shakespeare among known dramatists had any known links with the name Hamlet, and his could hardly have been more intimate or intense.”

Despite this, Prince Hamlet's name is more often seen as related to the Amleth character in Saxo Grammaticus' Vita Amlethi, an old Scandinavian legend that is very similar to Shakespeare's story. More recent scholarship has argued that, while Hamlet has a Scandinavian origin and may have been selected as a play subject for commercial reasons, Shakespeare's grief over the loss of his only son may lie at the heart of the tragedy.

Speculation over Hamnet's influence on Shakespeare's works is not limited to Hamlet. Richard Wheeler theorises that Hamnet's death influenced the writing of Twelfth Night, which centres on a girl who believes that her twin brother has died. In the end, she finds that her brother never died, and is alive and well. Wheeler also posits the idea that the women who disguise themselves as men in The Merchant of Venice, As You Like It, and Twelfth Night are a representation of William Shakespeare's seeing his son's hope in his daughters after Hamnet's death. Bill Bryson argues that Constance's speech from the third act of King John (written mid-1590s) was inspired by Hamnet's death. In the speech, she laments the loss of her son, Arthur. It is possible, though, that Hamnet was still alive when Constance's lament was written. Many other plays of Shakespeare's have theories surrounding Hamnet. These include questions as to whether a scene in Julius Caesar in which Caesar adopts Mark Antony as a replacement for his dead son is related to Hamnet's death, or whether Romeo and Juliet is a tragic reflection of the loss of a son, or Alonso's guilt over his son's death in The Tempest is related. Sonnet 37 may have also been written in response to Hamnet's death. Shakespeare says in it, "As a decrepit father takes delight / To see his active child do deeds of youth / So I, made lame by fortune's dearest spight / Take all my comfort of thy worth and truth." Still, if this is an allusion to Hamnet, it is a vague one. The grief can echo also in one of the most painful passages Shakespeare ever wrote, in the end of King Lear where the ruined monarch recognizes his daughter is dead: "No, no, no life! / Why should a dog, a horse, a rat, have life, / And thou no breath at all? Thou'lt come no more, / Never, never, never, never, never!"

Michael Wood suggests that sonnet 33 might have nothing to do with the so-called Fair Youth sonnets, but that instead it alludes to Hamnet's death and there is an implied pun on "sun" and "son": "Even so my sun one early morn did shine / With all triumphant splendour on my brow; / But out, alack, he was but one hour mine, / The region cloud hath mask'd him from me now".

Juan Daniel Millán suggests that not only sonnet 33 alludes to Hamnet's death, but that all of the sonnets were dedicated to Hamnet and that the sonnets were Shakespeare's way of dealing with the loss. He also suggests that Hamnet is the so-called Fair Youth.

In popular culture

Hamnet appears in one of Neil Gaiman's The Sandman comics, "A Midsummer Night's Dream," in which he is seen accompanying his father and playing the role of the changeling boy.

In the 2007 Doctor Who episode "The Shakespeare Code," Hamnet is briefly mentioned by his father.

He also appears as a character in the 2018 film All Is True, written by Ben Elton. The largely fictionalised plot revolves around William Shakespeare coming to terms with Hamnet's death and his relationship with his family.

Irish novelist Maggie O'Farrell's 2020 book Hamnet is a fictional account of the life of Hamnet.

Hamnet Shakespeare is a character in the BBC comedy drama series Upstart Crow, about the life of William Shakespeare in London and Stratford-upon-Avon. Hamnet's death occurs in the final episode of series 3.

References

Sources

External links 
 Shakespeare's children and grandchildren

1585 births
1596 deaths
People from Stratford-upon-Avon
Shakespeare family
16th-century English people
Burials in Warwickshire
16th-century deaths from plague (disease)
Infectious disease deaths in England
Child deaths
English twins